Kaland is a village in Meerut district.

The nearest railway station to Kaland is Sakhoti Tanda which is located in and around  distant.

Demographics
Kaland is a large village with about 736 families residing, It has population of 4497 of which 2382 are males while 2115 are females as per Population Census 2011. Average sex ratio of Kaland village is 888 which is lower than Uttar Pradesh state average of 912. Child sex ratio for the Kaland as per census is 780, lower than Uttar Pradesh average of 902.

Kaland village has higher literacy rate compared to Uttar Pradesh. In 2011, literacy rate of Kaland village was 72.21% compared to 67.68% of Uttar Pradesh. As per constitution of India and Panchyati Raaj Act, Kaland village is administrated by Sarpanch (Head of Village) who is elected representative of village.

References

Villages in Meerut district